C. B. Hustlers is a 1976 American Action-adventure/comedy film directed by Stu Segall. Although the film has been referred to as a vansploitation film, vans play a smaller role than in other films of that genre.

Plot

A couple known only by their alias 'Dancer' and 'Scuzz' are a married pair of drifters who make a living by employing a trio of loose young women, known as the C.B. Hustlers. They travel up and down the I-5 expressway in southern California in two separate vans where the young women pick up truck drivers and other travelers at rest stop areas and truck depots where they charge them $25 each for sexual favors, with Dancer and Scuzz receiving 40% of the Hustlers profits. They communicate with each other and their clients on their C.B. short wave radios by code talk to make appointments with their trucker clients and always stay one step ahead of the law when the truckers radio advance warnings of "smokies" (police) in the area. In public, Dancer and Scuzz go by their real names of "Mr. and Mrs. Turner" and always introduce the three young women as their daughters to avoid any unwanted attention.

Small town sheriff Elrod P. Ramsey cannot seem to catch the Hustler's work in the act, so he employs two men, Boots Clayborn and Mountain Dean, who own and operate the local newspaper to investigate and hope to catch the Hustlers in the act. While Mountain sees this as a potential story for his newspaper to advance his career, Boots meets and soon becomes enamored with one of the young Hustlers and even tries to help them stay one step ahead of the law.

Cast
 John F. Goff (credited as Jake Barnes) as Boots Clayborn
 Richard Kennedy (credited as Edward Roehm) as Mountain Dean
 John Alderman as 'Dancer'/Mr. Turner
 Jacqueline Giroux (credited as Valdesta) as 'Scuzz'/Mrs. Turner
 Uschi Digard (credited as Elke Vann) as Dee Dee; C.B. Hustler
 Janus Blythe (credited as Janice Jordan) as Silky; C.B. Hustler
 Catherine Barkley as the Blonde C.B. Hustler
 John Tull (credited as Lance Longworth) as Moonshine
 Douglas Gudbye as Hogbreath
 Bruce Kimball the diver, would've been 13 in 1976, fix this (credited as Michael Alden) as Sheriff Elrod P. Ramsey

Reception
After its re-release on DVD in 2003, the film received mainly negative reviews that criticized mainly its cinematography and script.

See also
 List of American films of 1976

References

External links

1976 films
American independent films
Vansploitation films
1970s English-language films
1970s American films